The East Aberdeenshire, by-election 1906 was a parliamentary by-election held for the House of Commons constituency of East Aberdeenshire in the County of Aberdeen in Scotland on 28 February 1906.

Vacancy
The by-election was caused by the death of the sitting Liberal MP, James Annand on 6 February 1906. Annand had been an MP for only a few days and died before he had an opportunity to take his seat, so becoming one of the shortest-serving MPs in history.

Candidates
The Liberals chose James Murray of Aberdeen, a 55-year-old art collector who was Chairman of the Aberdeen Art Gallery, as their candidate. The Unionists met on 24 February and decided not to stand a candidate. Annand's opponent at the 1906 general election, the Liberal Unionist, Archibald White Maconochie, who had been the local MP from 1900 till 1906, declined to stand again and the Unionists felt it was inadvisable to bring a stranger into the constituency at short notice after their recent defeat.

The result
There being no other candidates putting themselves forward Murray was returned unopposed. He held his seat until January 1910 United Kingdom general election when he stood down from Parliament.

See also
Lists of United Kingdom by-elections 
United Kingdom by-election records

References

Unopposed by-elections to the Parliament of the United Kingdom in Scottish constituencies
Politics of Aberdeenshire
East Aberdeenshire by-election
20th century in Aberdeenshire
East Aberdeenshire by-election
East Aberdeenshire by-election
1900s elections in Scotland